Al-Masmiyya al-Saghira, also known as Mamsiyyat al-Hurani, was a Palestinian Arab village in the Gaza Subdistrict, located  northeast of Gaza. Al-Masmiyya al-Saghira was depopulated during the 1948 Arab-Israeli War, but prior to that, in 1945, it had a population of 530 inhabitants.

History
Al-Masmiyya al-Saghira was established in the second half of the 19th century by al-Hurani clan who had lived in the adjacent al-Masmiyya al-Kabira, but left because of feuds with other residents. Thus, the village was also known as "Masmiyyat al-Hurani". The adjectival Saghira means "minor" in Arabic and was used to differentiate it from al-Mamsiyya al-Kabira, the latter word meaning "major".

British Mandate era
In the 1922 census of Palestine conducted by the British Mandate authorities, Mesmiyet Saghira had a population of 261 inhabitants, all Muslims, increasing in the  1931 census when Masmiya El Saghira had an all-Muslim  population of 354  in 73 houses.

In  the 1945 statistics the population of  El Masmiya es Sagira  was 530 Muslims, while  the total land area was 6,478 dunams, according to an official land and population survey.  Of this, a total of  147 dunams  were used  for citrus and bananas, 7  for plantations and irrigable land, 6,126 for cereals, while 18 dunams were built-up areas.

Seven small shops provided the village with its basic needs and children attended school in al-Masmiyya al-Kabira. Agriculture was the mainstay of the economy, grain being the dominant crop. In addition to cultivation, the inhabitants raised livestock which numbered approximately 4,000 animals, including sheep, goats, cattle, camels, mules. Farmers participated in the weekly market of al-Faluja, and also sold their products in the cities of Gaza, al-Majdal (Ashkelon), and Jaffa.

1948 and aftermath
The circumstances of al-Masmiyya al-Saghira's capture by Israel was identical to those of its sister village, al-Masmiyya al-Kabira which was occupied by the Givati Brigade on July 8–9, 1948. Israeli historian Benny Morris writes that the military operation was undertaken occurred in the ten days between the first two truces of the 1948 Arab-Israeli War and that it "precipitated the evacuation of the village". Following the war the area was incorporated into the State of Israel and the moshav of Kfar HaRif was established on al-Masmiyya al-Saghira's lands in 1956. According to Walid Khalidi: "Virtually no trace of the village remains, and the site is overgrown with weeds, tall grasses, and a scattering of eucalyptus trees".

See also
Depopulated Palestinian locations in Israel

References

Bibliography

External links
Welcome to al-Masmiyya al-Saghira
al-Masmiyya al-Saghira, Zochrot
Survey of Western Palestine, Map 16:   IAA, Wikimedia commons

District of Gaza
Arab villages depopulated during the 1948 Arab–Israeli War

he:מסמיה